Rhoogeton is a genus of flowering plants belonging to the family Gesneriaceae.

Its native range is Venezuela to Guyana and Northern Brazil.

Species:

Rhoogeton cyclophyllus 
Rhoogeton viviparus

References

Gesnerioideae
Gesneriaceae genera